The Thirteen Buddhist Sites of Kamakura（鎌倉十三佛霊場, Kamakura jūsan butsu reijō）are a group of 13 Buddhist sacred sites in Kanagawa Prefecture, Japan. The temples are dedicated to the Thirteen Buddhas.

Directory

See also
 Thirteen Buddhas

Buddhist temples in Kanagawa Prefecture
Buddhist pilgrimage sites in Japan